Simphiwe Dana (born 23 January 1980) is a South African singer and songwriter who works mostly in her mother tongue, the Xhosa language. Dana is also known for her creative social commentary and activism through music as a political art form. Her career in music began in 2002, at the age of 22.

Born in Butterworth and raised  in Lusikisiki in Transkei, Dana signed a record deal with Gallo Records and released her debut studio album,  Zandisile (2004), which became a commercially success, won Best Newcomer and Best Jazz Album.

Early life
Simphiwe was born on 23 January 1980 in Butterworth, Transkei, South Africa and raised in the town of Lusikisiki.

Dana came from a religious background with her father being a preacher and as she grew up in the church, exposing her to music in both choral and gospel forms.

Education
She attended  Vela Private School in Mthatha, where she matriculated in 1997.

Her tertiary education pursued her interests in graphic design, and she successfully studied for her National Diploma in IT at the Wits Technikon, Johannesburg.

Career
After signed a record deal with Gallo Records, her debut album  Zandisile was released in 2004. The album sold very well and gained several awards, including some South African Music Award (SAMA) in 2005. On its worldwide release the album gained success in the Billboard charts and she won an AVO Session Basel Award. 

In 2005, Dana won the "Best Newcomer" award and Best Jazz Vocal album at the 11th South African Music Awards with her first album Zandisile.

In 2007, she was named the "Best Female Artist", with the song "The One Love Movement on Bantu Biko Street", at the 13th South African Music Awards. She is a creative advocate of Afrofuturism and Afrofeminism. 

On July 9, 2010, Dana's  third studio album  Kulture Noir was released in South Africa. At 10th Annually ceremony of Metro FM Music Awards, she took home two awards;  Best Contemporary Jazz, Best Female. On November 25, 2018, she performed at Moncalieri Jazz Festival in Turin.

In 2013 she started  to record her album Firebrand and delayed to release it following  the exit to her former label. In early  2014, she  signed a record deal with Sony Music. On October  21, 2015, his fourth studio album Firebrand was released. The album produced four singles "Killjoy", "Roll Me Down", "Masterpiece" and  "My Light".

On April 24, 2020, her fifth  studio album Bamako was released.

Discography

Studio albums 
 Zandisile (2004)
 The One Love Movement on Bantu Biko Street (2006)
 Kulture Noir (2010)
  Firebrand (2015)
Bamako (album) (2020)
 TBA (2025)

Live albums 
 An Evening with Simphiwe Dana: Live at the Lyric Theatre (2011)
 Celebrating Ten Years Live at the Bassline (2016)
 The Simphiwe Dana Symphony Experience (2017)

Inspiration
Dana's music draws strongly on her upbringing in the Transkei, and she cites the powerful singing of her mother as an inspiration for her and her siblings, and ultimately as a key motivator in her resolve to pursue her musical career.She has been cited as the modern day Mama Africa.

Achievements

South African  Afro Pop Awards

|-
|-
|rowspan="3"|2021
|rowspan="3"|Saafma
|Best Female Artist Award
|
|-
|Best Song of the Year 
|
|-
|Best Rising Star
|

South African Music Awards

|-
|2005
| Herself 
| Best Newcomer 
|
|-
|2021
|Bamako
|Best Adult  Contemporary Album 
|

References

External links

 Official home page
 Myspace website

1980 births
Living people
21st-century South African women singers
Xhosa people
Singers from Johannesburg
South African songwriters